Edward Robert Nito "Eddie" Pasquale (born November 20, 1990) is a Canadian professional ice hockey goaltender who is currently playing for Metallurg Magnitogorsk in the Kontinental Hockey League (KHL). He has formerly played with the Tampa Bay Lightning of the National Hockey League (NHL). Pasquale was selected by the Atlanta Thrashers in the fourth round (117th overall) of the 2009 NHL Entry Draft.

Playing career

Junior
Pasquale played in the Ontario Hockey League for the Belleville Bulls for parts of both the 2006/07 and 2007/08 seasons. Midway through his second season in Belleville, he was traded to the Saginaw Spirit. He would spend the next two and a half seasons here, becoming the Spirit starter in both the 2008/09 and 2009/10 seasons. Praised for traits such as consistency, Pasquale was named to the OHL's third all-star team for the 2008/09 OHL season. He also played in the 2009 CHL Top Prospects game. In his final OHL season, Pasquale stopped over 1800 shots.

Professional
The Atlanta Thrashers selected Pasquale, the 117th overall selection of the 2009 NHL Entry Draft. Following his junior career, Pasquale was assigned to the Chicago Wolves of the American Hockey League. Here Pasquale filled the role of backup goaltender, playing in 24 games. He also spent some time in the ECHL, playing with the Gwinnett Gladiators. During the 2011 offseason, the Thrashers relocated to Winnipeg, Manitoba, and became the Jets. Pasquale started the 2011–12 season by attending Jets training camp before he was assigned to AHL affiliate, the St. John's IceCaps for the remainder of his entry-level contract.

On June 27, 2014, Pasquale was traded by the Jets in an exchange of draft picks at the 2014 NHL Entry Draft to the Washington Capitals. Pasquale would never play in a competitive game in the Capitals organization as he sat out the 2014–15 season, recuperating from hip surgery.

On July 3, 2015, Pasquale as a free agent, signed a one-year, two-way contract with the St. John's IceCaps, now affiliated with the Montreal Canadiens. On October 13, he would be sent down to the Canadiens' ECHL affiliate, the Brampton Beast.

On July 1, 2016, Pasquale signed as a free agent to a one-year, two-way contract with the Detroit Red Wings. During the 2016–17 season, Pasquale appeared in 29 games with the Grand Rapids Griffins, posting a 15–9–5 record, a 2.43 goals against average (GAA), a .919 save percentage and four shutouts, helping lead Grand Rapids to the Calder Cup.

On July 1, 2017, Pasquale left the Red Wings and signed as a free agent to a one-year, two-way contract with the Edmonton Oilers. On January 31, 2018, the Oilers traded Pasquale to the Tampa Bay Lightning for future considerations. On December 4, 2018, Pasquale made his NHL debut against the Detroit Red Wings at Little Caesars Arena. Pasquale helped the Lightning defeat the Red Wings that night in a 6–5 shootout win. He would play two more games with the Lightning, including the final game of the year, where he helped them beat the Boston Bruins, which tied the NHL record for most wins in a season.

In his second season with the Syracuse Crunch, he won the Harry "Hap" Holmes Memorial Award. The award goes to the goaltenders of the American Hockey League team with the lowest goals against average and who have appeared in at least 25 regular season games.

As an impending free agent, on June 14, 2019, Pasquale opted to sign his first contract abroad since turning professional in 2010, agreeing to a one-year contract with Kazakh-based club, Barys Nur-Sultan of the KHL. In his debut season in the KHL, Pasquale had a successful 2019–20 campaign, registering a 2.03 goals against average and picking up goaltender of the week honours on two occasions to help Barys qualify for the post-season.

As a free agent from Barys, Pasquale was rewarded with an improved two-year contract with Russian-based club, Lokomotiv Yaroslavl, on May 1, 2020.

On 1 June 2022, Pasquale as a free agent from Lokomotiv, continued his career in the KHL by agreeing to a one-year contract with Metallurg Magnitogorsk.

International play
In January 2022, Pasquale was selected to play for Team Canada at the 2022 Winter Olympics.

Career statistics

Regular season and playoffs

International

Awards and honours

References

External links

1990 births
Living people
Atlanta Thrashers draft picks
Bakersfield Condors players
Barys Nur-Sultan players
Belleville Bulls players
Brampton Beast players
Canadian ice hockey goaltenders
Chicago Wolves players
Grand Rapids Griffins players
Gwinnett Gladiators players
Lokomotiv Yaroslavl players
Saginaw Spirit players
Ice hockey people from Toronto
St. John's IceCaps players
Syracuse Crunch players
Tampa Bay Lightning players
Ice hockey players at the 2022 Winter Olympics
Olympic ice hockey players of Canada